The White Terror in Russia refers to the organized violence and mass killings carried out by the White Army during the Russian Civil War (1917–23). It began after the Bolsheviks seized power in November 1917, and continued until the defeat of the White Army at the hands of the Red Army. The Bolsheviks' Red Terror was carried out at the same time. According to some Russian historians, the White Terror was a series of premeditated actions directed by their leaders, although this is contested by most Russian historians who view it as spontaneous and disorganized. Estimates for those killed in the White Terror vary between 20,000 and 100,000 people.

Comparison with the Red Terror 
A number of historians believe that, unlike the Red Terror proclaimed by the Bolsheviks as a means of establishing their political dominance, the term 'White Terror' had neither legislative nor propaganda approval in the White movement during the Civil War. Historians admit that the White armies were not alien to the cruelty inherent in the war, however, they believe that the "black pages" of the White armies differed fundamentally from the policy of the Bolsheviks:

The Whites did not create organizations similar to the Bolshevik emergency commissions (Cheka) and revolutionary tribunals;
The leaders of the White movement never called for mass terror, for executions on social grounds, for the taking and execution of hostages if the enemies did not comply with certain requirements;
 The members of the White movement saw neither ideological nor practical necessity in carrying out mass terror. They were convinced that the purpose of the Whites' military actions was not a war against some broad masses or social classes, but a war with a small party that had seized power in Russia and used the socio-economic and political situation, as well as market conditions, in their own interests to achieve the goal, as well as manipulating the changes in the moods of the lower classes of Russian society.

A number of researchers believe that the peculiarity of the White Terror was its disorganized, spontaneous nature, and that it was not elevated to the rank of state policy, did not act as a means of intimidating the population and did not serve as a means of destroying social classes or ethnic groups (Cossacks, Kalmyks), something the Bolsheviks did.

At the same time, a number of Russian historians point out that the orders issued by high officials of the White movement, as well as the legislative acts of the White governments, testify to the sanctioning by the military and political authorities of repressive actions and acts of terror against the Bolsheviks and the population supporting them, and their role in intimidating the population of controlled territories.

Doctor of Historical Sciences G. A. Trukan notes that Soviet authors focused mainly on the White Terror, many modern authors who sympathize with the White movement act the other way around. However, according to Trukan, in the territories occupied by the Whites, there were no less atrocities and outrages than in Bolshevik-controlled territory.

Southern and Western Russia 

After Lavr Kornilov was killed in April 1918, the leadership of the Volunteer Army passed to Anton Denikin. During the Denikin regime, the press regularly urged violence against Jews. For example, a proclamation by one of Denikin's generals incited people to "arm themselves" in order to extirpate "the evil force which lives in the hearts of Jew-communists." In the small town of Fastov alone, Denikin's Volunteer Army murdered over 1,500 Jews, mostly the elderly, women, and children. An estimated 100,000 to 150,000 Jews in Ukraine and southern Russia were killed in pogroms perpetrated by Denikin's forces as well as Symon Petliura's Ukrainian nationalists. Hundreds of thousands of Jews were left homeless and tens of thousands became victims of serious illness.

In the Don Province, the Soviet government was pushed out by a Cossack regime headed by Pyotr Krasnov. Approximately 25,000 to 40,000 people were executed by Krasnov's White Cossacks, which lasted until the Red Army conquered the region following their victory at Tsaritsyn.

In 1918 when the Whites controlled the Northern Territory with a population of about 400,000 people, more than 38,000 were sent to prisons. Of those, about 8,000 were executed while thousands more died from torture and disease.

Eastern Russia 
In November 1918, after seizing power in Siberia, Admiral Alexander Kolchak pursued a policy of persecuting revolutionaries as well as socialists of several factions. Kolchak's government issued a broadly worded decree on December 3, 1918, revising articles of the criminal code of Imperial Russia "in order to preserve the system and rule of the Supreme Ruler". Articles 99 and 100 established capital punishment for assassination attempts on the Supreme Ruler and for attempting to overthrow the authorities. Under Article 103, "insults written, printed, and oral, are punishable by imprisonment". Bureaucratic sabotage under Article 329 was punishable by hard labor for 15 to 20 years. Additional decrees followed, adding more power. On 11 April 1919, the Kolchak government adopted Regulation 428, "About the dangers of public order due to ties with the Bolshevik Revolt", which was published in the Omsk newspaper Omsk Gazette (no. 188 of July 1919). It provided a term of 5 years of prison for "individuals considered a threat to the public order because of their ties in any way with the Bolshevik revolt". In the case of an unauthorized return from exile, there could be hard labor for 4 to 8 years. Articles 99–101 allowed the death penalty, forced labor and imprisonment, and repression by military courts, and they also imposed no investigation commissions.

An excerpt from the order of the government of Yenisei county in the Irkutsk Governorate, General. S. Rozanov said:
Those villages whose population meets troops with arms, burn down the villages and shoot the adult males without exception.
If hostages are taken in cases of resistance to government troops, shoot the hostages without mercy.

A member of the Central Committee of the right-wing Socialist Revolutionaries, D. Rakov wrote about the terror of Kolchak's forces: 
Omsk just froze in horror. At a time when the wives of dead comrades, day and night looked in the snow for bodies, I was unaware of the horror behind the walls of the guardhouse. At least 2500 people were killed. Entire carts of bodies were carried to a city, like winter lamb and pork carcasses. Those who suffered were mainly soldiers of the garrison and the workers.

In the Urals, Siberia, and the Far East, extraordinary cruelty was practiced by several Cossack warlords: B. Annenkov, A. Dutov, G. Semyonov, and I. Kalmykov. During the trial against Annenkov, there was testimony about the robbing peasants and atrocities under the slogan: “We have no restrictions! God is with us and Ataman Annenkov: slash right and left!”. In September 1918, during the suppression of peasant uprisings in Slavgorod county, Annenkov tortured and killed up to 500 people. The village of Black Dole was burned down, after which peasants were tortured and shot, including the wives and children of the peasants. Girls of Slavgorod and surrounding areas were brought to Annenkov's train, raped, and then shot. According to an eyewitness, Annenkov behaved with brutal torture: victims had their eyes gouged and tongues and strips of their back cut off, were buried alive, or tied to horses. In Semipalatinsk, Annenkov threatened to shoot every fifth resident if the city refused to pay indemnities.

On May 9, 1918, after Ataman Dutov captured Alekasandrov-Gai village, nearly 2,000 men of the Red Army were buried alive. More than 700 people from the village were executed. After capturing Troitsk, Orenburg, and other cities, a regime of terror was installed over 6,000 people, of whom 500 were killed just during interrogations. In Chelyabinsk, Dutov's men executed or deported to Siberian prisons over 9,000 people. In Troitsk, Dutov's men in the first weeks after the capture of the city shot about 700 people. In Ileka they killed over 400. These mass executions were typical of Dutov's Cossack troops. Dutov's executive order of August 4, 1918 imposed the death penalty for evasion of military service and for even passive resistance to authorities on its territory. In one district of the Ural region in January 1918, Dutov's men killed over 1,000 people. On April 3, 1919, the Cossack warlord ordered his troops to shoot and take hostages for the slightest display of opposition. In the village of Sugar, Dutov's men burned down a hospital with hundreds of Red Army patients.

The Semenov regime in Transbaikalia was characterized by mass terror and executions. More than 1,600 people were shot. Semenov himself admitted in court that his troops burned villages. Eleven permanent death houses were set up, where refined forms of torture were practiced. Semyonov personally supervised the torture chambers, during which some 6,500 people were murdered.

Major General William S. Graves, who commanded North-American occupation forces in Siberia, testified that:
Semeonoff and Kalmikoff soldiers, under the protection of Japanese troops, were roaming the country like wild animals, killing and robbing the people, and these murders could have been stopped any day Japan wished. If questions were asked about these brutal murders, the reply was that the people murdered were Bolsheviks and this explanation, apparently, satisfied the world. Conditions were represented as being horrible in Eastern Siberia, and that life was the cheapest thing there. There were horrible murders committed, but they were not committed by the Bolsheviks as the world believes. I am well on the side of safety when I say that the anti-Bolsheviks killed one hundred people in Eastern Siberia, to every one killed by the Bolsheviks.

In literature 
Many Soviet authors wrote about the heroism of the Russian people in combating the White Terror. Novels include Furmanov's Chapaev, Serafimovich's The Iron Flood, and Fadeyev's The Rout.  Many of the early short stories and novels of Sholokhov, Leonov, and Fedin were devoted to this theme.
 	 		
Nikolai Ostrovsky's autobiographical novel How the Steel was Tempered documents episodes of the White Terror in western Ukraine by anti-Soviet units.

Interpretations 
In The Black Book of Communism, Nicolas Werth contrasts the Red and White terrors, noting the former was the official policy of the Bolshevik government:

The Bolshevik policy of terror was more systematic, better organized, and targeted at whole social classes. Moreover, it had been thought out and put into practice before the outbreak of the civil war. The White Terror was never systematized in such a fashion. It was almost invariably the work of detachments that were out of control, and taking measures not officially authorized by the military command that was attempting, without much success, to act as a government. If one discounts the pogroms, which Denikin himself condemned, the White Terror most often was a series of reprisals by the police acting as a sort of military counterespionage force. The Cheka and the Troops for the Internal Defense of the Republic were a structured and powerful instrument of repression of a completely different order, which had support at the highest level from the Bolshevik regime.

Memorials to victims of the White Terror 

During the Soviet period, a significant number of monuments were dedicated to victims of the White Terror. Most monuments were constructed in Russia, mainly as memorials or in visible places of towns and cities.

Since 1920, the central square in Tsaritsyn has been called the "Square of Fallen Fighters", where the remains of 55 victims of the White Terror are buried. A monument established in 1957 in black and red granite has an inscription: "To the freedom fighters of Red Tsaritsyn. Buried here are the heroic defenders of Red Tsaritsyn brutally tortured by White Guard butchers in 1919."

A monument to victims of the White Terror stands in Vyborg. It was erected in 1961 near the Leningrad Highway to commemorate 600 people shot by machine gun.

The "In Memory of Victims of the White Terror" monument in Voronezh is located in a park near the regional Nikitinskaia libraries. The monument was unveiled in 1920 on the site of public executions in 1919 by the troops of Mamantov.

In Sevastopol on the 15th Bastion Street, there is a "Communard Cemetery and victims of White terror". The cemetery is named in honor of the members of the Communist underground killed by the Whites in 1919–20.

In the city of Slavgorod in Altai Krai, there is a monument for participants of the Chernodolsky Uprising and their families who fell victim to the White terror of Ataman Annekov.

See also 
 Red Terror
 Antisemitism in Ukraine
 Lenin's Hanging Order
 Russian famine of 1921–22
 Russian Fascist Party
 Terrorism and the Soviet Union
 White Terror (Finland)
 White Terror (Greece)
 White Terror (Hungary)
 White Terror (Spain)
 White Terror (Taiwan)

References

Notes

Bibliography 
 Bisher, Jamie. White Terror: Cossack Warlords of the Trans-Siberian (Routledge, 2006)
 Bortnevski, Viktor G. "White Administration and White Terror (The Denikin Period)." Russian Review (1993): 354–366. in JSTOR
 Holquist, Peter. "Violent Russia, Deadly Marxism? Russia in the Epoch of Violence, 1905-21." Kritika: Explorations in Russian and Eurasian History (2003) 4#3 pp: 627–652. online
 Lincoln, W. Bruce. Red victory: A history of the Russian Civil War (Da Capo Press, 1989)
 Mawdsley, Evan. The Russian Civil War (Pegasus Books, 2007)

 Novikova, Liudmila G. "Russia's Red Revolutionary and White Terror, 1917–1921: A Provincial Perspective." Europe-Asia Studies (2013) 65#9 pp: 1755–1770.
 Sanborn, Joshua. "The genesis of Russian warlordism: Violence and governance during the First World War and the Civil War." Contemporary European History (2010) 19#3 pp: 195–213.

In Russian
 А. Литвин. Красный и белый террор 1918–1922. — М.: Эксмо, 2004 [revised second edition; first edition published 1995][A. Litvin. Red and White Terror of 1918-1922. Eksmo, 2004] 
 д. и. н. Цветков В. Ж. Белый террор — преступление или наказание? Эволюция судебно-правовых норм ответственности за государственные преступления в законодательстве белых правительств в 1917—1922 гг. [Tsvetkov, J. White Terror - Crime or Punishment? The evolution of judicial and legal norms of responsibility for crimes against the state in the legislation the White governments in 1917-1922.] 
 И. С. Ратьковский. Красный террор и деятельность ВЧК в 1918 году. СПб.: Изд-во С.-Петерб. ун-та, 2006. [Ratkovsky, IS. The Red Terror and the Activities of The Cheka in 1918. Izd-vo c.Peterb. un-ta, 2006. .] 
 П. А. Голуб. Белый террор в России (1918—1920 гг.). М.: Патриот, 2006. 479 с. . [Golub, P. White Terror in Russia (1918–1920 years). Moscow: Patriot, 2006. .5-7030-0951-0.] 
 Зимина В. Д. Белое дело взбунтовавшейся России: Политические режимы Гражданской войны. 1917—1920 гг. М.: Рос. гуманит. ун-т, 2006. 467 с (Сер. История и память) [Zimin, VD. Whites in Russia: Political regimes of the Civil War. 1917-1920. Humanitarian. Univ, 2006. ]

Further reading

Political repression in Russia
War crimes in Russia
Political and cultural purges
Anti-communist terrorism
White Terror
White movement
Mass murder in 1918
Mass murder in 1919